Psychomyia is a genus of insects belonging to the family Psychomyiidae.

The genus has almost cosmopolitan distribution.

Species:
 Psychomyia adun Malicky & Chantaramongkol, 1993 
 Psychomyia aigina Malicky, 1997

References

Trichoptera
Trichoptera genera